Dieter Speer (born 24 February 1942) is a former East German biathlete.

He was the first German to hold the title when he became world champion in biathlon in 1971, beating the outstanding Alexander Tikhonov over 20 kilometres. Tikhonov could be said to be partly responsible for Speer's success, since the rifle was a gift from Tikhonov.

Speer was able to return the favour a year later at the 1972 Winter Olympics in Sapporo, lending Tikhonov his ski when the latter fell during the relay and broke a ski. In that event, the Russians won, and the East German team only got a bronze medal.

Biathlon results
All results are sourced from the International Biathlon Union.

Olympic Games
1 medal (1 bronze)

World Championships
3 medals (1 gold, 2 bronze)

*During Olympic seasons competitions are only held for those events not included in the Olympic program.

References

External links
 
 SGD Zinnwald
 Article of the German Soviet Alliance 
 Portrait 

1942 births
Living people
People from Legnica
German male biathletes
Biathletes at the 1968 Winter Olympics
Biathletes at the 1972 Winter Olympics
Olympic biathletes of East Germany
Medalists at the 1972 Winter Olympics
Olympic medalists in biathlon
Olympic bronze medalists for East Germany
Biathlon World Championships medalists